Triplophysa microphysa is a species of ray-finned fish in the genus Triplophysa.

References

M
Fish described in 1935